Topola may refer to the following places:

Serbia
 Topola, Šumadija district 
 Bačka Topola, North Bačka district, Vojvodina
 Banatska Topola, North Banat district

Poland
 Greater Poland Voivodeship:
Topola, Piła County 
Topola, Środa Wielkopolska County
 Topola, Lower Silesian Voivodeship
 Topola, Lublin Voivodeship 
 Topola, Kuyavian-Pomeranian Voivodeship
 Świętokrzyskie Voivodeship:
Topola, Busko County 
Topola, Kazimierza County

Slovakia
Topoľa

Bulgaria
Topola, Dobrich Province

See also 
 
 Other Polish places
 Topola Katowa
 Topola Królewska
 Topola Mała
 Topola Szlachecka
 Topola Wielka
 Topola-Osiedle
 Miedniewice-Topola

Derivatives
 Nova Topola (disambiguation)

 Similar spellings (same word roots)
 Topol (disambiguation)
 Topla (disambiguation)